Binche Palace is located in Binche in the Belgian province of Hainaut, Wallonia. The medieval castle and subsequent Renaissance palace served as residence for the counts of Hainaut, the dukes of Burgundy and the Habsburg rulers of the Netherlands. The most famous resident has been Mary of Hungary, governor of the Netherlands. It was one of the first renaissance palaces in the Low Countries and was intended to rival the French palace of Fontainebleau. The palace was destroyed by soldiers of king Henry II of France. Today, only some medieval walls and fundaments remain of the castle and palace.

History
Baldwin IV, Count of Hainaut, also known as Baldwin the Builder, constructed the first castle in Binche in the 12th century. At the same time, he surrounded the city by large walls, which are almost entirely preserved till modern times. The château was known as the "Château de la Salles" during the 15th century. Philip the Good, duke of Burgundy, restored the castle in 1461. Margaret of York, widow of Charles the Bold, duke of Burgundy, received Binche as a dowry. She extended the castle around 1500. 

Mary, Queen of Hungary became Governor of the Netherlands in 1528. She often stayed in Binche, which soon became one of her favourite residences. Her brother, Charles V, the Holy Roman Emperor, presented the city and the imperial estate of Binche to her in 1545. Mary decided to raze the medieval castle to the ground and to construct a magnificent and sumptuous palace in its place. It was one of the first Renaissance palaces in the Netherlands. The architect Jacques du Broeucq was responsible for the design. He also constructed for Mary a hunting lodge close by to Binche in Morlanwelz, called Mariemont Palace (literally, the palace on the hill of Mary). The construction of Binche palace took three years, and the building looked very similar to a renaissance castle earlier designed and constructed by Du Broeucq in Boussu. Of the old medieval castle, only the wing renovated by Margaret of York remained. The palace complex consisted of two towers and a two-story main building and two additional one-story wings. In addition, there was a chapel. There were various halls, a grand and a small gallery, dining rooms, kitchens, stables and other buildings. Most impressive were the large hall on the first floor (30*13,5 meters) and the 'riche logis' of Mary (18*9 meters). The palace was hailed as one of the wonders of the world.

In 1549, Mary receives Charles V and her nephew, the future king Philip II. The year before, the aging emperor decided to have his son recognized as successor by the various principalities in his empire. The imperial procession arrives in Binche on 22 August 1549. Mary was aware of the importance of the event and organized a grand reception: parties, balls and tournaments followed each other for six days. Upon return to Spain, king Philipp II was so impressed by Binche palace that it served as inspiration for the construction of the royal palaces in Aranjuez, El Pardo, and Valsain.

Shortly after these festivities, the old conflict between Spain and France flared up again. In the spring of 1554, the imperial army entered Picardy. Amongst others, they destroyed the favourite palace of the French king, the château of Folembray. The French, however, counterattacked. On 21 July they invaded Binche and Mariemont, both palaces were set on fire in retaliation. It was Henry II himself who lit the fire and had a plaque attached to the ruins: "Queen of foolishness, remember Folembray!"

Parts of the palace were saved from destruction. Restoration work started already in 1554, but stopped when Mary left the Netherlands in 1556 to go to Spain together with her brother after his resignation. Under Archdukes Albert and Isabella of Habsburg, sovereign of the Netherlands, a restoration was attempted but failed to reach completion as the palace of Mariemont was restored as well, and the palace of Binche fell out of grace.  A number of sculpted pieces were sent to Mons (such as the entrance gate) or were reused in Binche itself. In the second half of the 17th century, the palace fell into ruins and around 1704, the palace was demolished. A public park was created on the remains in the 19th century.

Large parts of the palace were excavated and examined by the archaeological department of Wallonia in the 20th century.

Bibliography
 Samuel Glot: "De Marie de Hongrie aux Gilles de Binche. Une double réalité, historique et mythique" in Les Cahiers Binchois Volume 13 (1995)
 Jacqueline Kerkhoff: "Maria van Hongarije en haar hof 1505-1558: tot plichtsbetrachting uitverkoren", Uitgeverij Verloren, Hilversum (2008)
 Rutger Tijs: "Renaissance- en barokarchitectuur in België: Vitruvius' erfenis en de ontwikkeling van de bouwkunst in de Zuidelijke Nederlanden van renaissance tot barok", Lannoo Uitgeverij (1999)
 L. Huguet: "Le château de Binche", Tournai, Malo et Levasseur, 1868.

 Essai de reconstitution de l’ancien castrum des Comtes de Hainaut (Aquarelle de l’architecte E. Devreux, in Binche : son histoire par les monuments, E. Piret, NM, p8)
 Essai de reconstitution du palais de Marie de Hongrie (Aquarelle de l’architecte E. Devreux, in Binche : son histoire par les monuments, E. Piret, NM, p12)
 Essai de reconstruction du château au XVIème siècle (Etudes archéologiques sur le palais de Marie de Hongrie par E. Devreux en juin 1926, in Binche au fil de l’Histoire, F. Ansion, Binche, lucpireéditions, 2014, p23)

References

External links
 http://www.castles.nl/binche-castle
 https://web.umons.ac.be/app/uploads/sites/7/2018/09/4.2.1.Marie_de_Hongrie_Laure_Beeckman_PP_Son.pdf - Article on the walls and castle of Binche by Laure Beeckman
 http://hainaut.mariemont.museum/Upload_Mariemont/Images_Docs/CDH/ELB-MRM-C833_13.pdf - Les Cahiers Binchois Volume 13

Buildings and structures completed in the 12th century
Buildings and structures completed in the 16th century
Castles in Belgium
Castles in Hainaut (province)
Demolished buildings and structures in Belgium
Buildings and structures demolished in 1704